The following is a list of all Olympique de Marseille presidents and managers.

Presidents

Managers

References

Managers
Olympique
Olympique de Marseille